The 2004–05 Iraqi Premier League kicked off on October 20, 2004. The 36 teams were split into four groups. At the end of the group stage, the top three teams from each group (a total of 12 teams) advanced to the Elite Stage, while the bottom three in each group were demoted to the lower division.

In the Elite Stage, the 12 teams were split into four groups of three, with teams playing home and away against each team in their group respectively. The top team in each of the four groups moved on to the two-legged semi-finals which determined who played for the championship game; a single match held in Baghdad. Al-Quwa Al-Jawiya won their fifth Premier League title with a 2–0 victory over Al-Minaa.

Group stage

North Group

Results

Euphrates Group

Results

Central Group

Results

South Group

Results

Elite stage

Group 1

Group 2

Group 3

Group 4

Golden stage

Semi-finals

First legs

Second legs

Al-Minaa won 1–0 on aggregate

Al-Quwa Al-Jawiya won 3–2 on aggregate

Third place match

Match officials
Assistant referees:
Aziz Jassim
Amjad Shaker

Match rules
90 minutes.
Penalty shootout if scores still level.

Final

Match officials
Assistant referees:
Mohammed Arab
Luay Subhi

Match rules
90 minutes.
30 minutes of extra-time if necessary.
Penalty shootout if scores still level.

Final positions

Season statistics

Top scorers

Hat-tricks

Notes
4 Player scored 4 goals
5 Player scored 5 goals

References

External links
 Iraq Football Association

Iraqi Premier League seasons
1
Iraq